Mount Baldhead, also known as Mt. Baldy and Radar Hill, is a tall dune about seventy miles north of the Indiana border on the west shore of Michigan in Allegan County.

Mount Baldhead is a 230-foot sand dune located on a narrow strip of land between Lake Michigan and Kalamazoo River, directly across the river from downtown Saugatuck.

A set of 302 stairs leads up the east side of the dune from a parking lot adjacent to Kalamazoo River to the Mount Baldhead Park at the top of the dune. A deck at the top of the stairs commands a view miles inland, with downtown Saugatuck below, immediately across the river, and Douglas just to the south. A number of trails lead down the wooded west side of the dune to the lake shore.

Also at the top of the dune is the Saugatuck Gap Filler Annex, an amazingly intact Cold War radar installation appearing almost exactly as it did during the Cold War era. The Saugatuck gap-filler is believed to be the last of the hundreds of SAGE system radars in public hands with nearly all of its Cold War era equipment still in place.

Mt. Baldy is also host to the very popular annual Mount Baldhead Challenge multi-terrain foot race which, of course, includes a jaunt up the stairs and contributes all proceeds to the Boys & Girls Club of Saugatuck/Douglas.

References 

Landforms of Allegan County, Michigan
Mountains of Michigan